An election was held for the Mayor of Auckland in September and October 2016, closing on 8 October, as part of the 2016 Auckland local government elections. Phil Goff was elected.

Background
Len Brown, previously the Mayor of Manukau City, was elected to three-year terms as Mayor of Auckland in 2010 and 2013, following the merger of several councils, including Manukau City Council, to form Auckland Council in 2010. He did not stand in 2016.

Candidates
Mario Alupis. 
Aileen Austin (Independent). 
Penny Bright (Independent), activist and 2013 mayoral candidate.
Patrick Brown (Communist League). 
Tricia Cheel (STOP). 
Victoria Crone (Independent), New Zealand managing director of Xero; announced candidacy on 14 December 2015.
Phil Goff (Independent), Labour MP for Mount Roskill; announced candidacy on 22 November 2015.
David Hay (Independent), former Green parliamentary candidate for Rodney and Epsom and former policy analyst for Manukau City and Auckland Council; announced candidacy on 20 November 2015. 
Alezix Heneti.
Adam Holland (Auckland Legalise Cannabis), perennial candidate 
Susanna Kruger
Stan Martin (Independent). 
Bin Thanh Nguyen (Independent). 
Phil O'Conner (Christians Against Abortion). 
John Palino (Independent), entrepreneur and 2013 mayoral runner-up; confirmed candidacy on 29 February 2016.
Tyrone Raumati (Greater Auckland), West Auckland based community leader. 
Chlöe Swarbrick (Independent), University of Auckland double graduate, journalist, and entrepreneur; announced candidacy on 4 July 2016. 
Mark Thomas (Independent), deputy chair of the Ōrākei Local Board; announced candidacy on 24 September 2015. During September he asked to withdraw from the race, conceding that it was "inevitable" that Phil Goff would win the election. Although he could not be removed from the ballot papers, Thomas refocused his campaign on Goff.
Wayne Young.

Prospective candidates who did not stand
Len Brown, incumbent mayor
John Banks, former Mayor of Auckland City, former National MP for Whangarei, ACT MP for Epsom and 2010 mayoral candidate
Michael Barnett, CEO of the Auckland Chamber of Commerce
Stephen Berry (Affordable Auckland), second runner-up in 2013 mayoral election and ACT candidate for parliamentary electorate of Upper Harbour in 2014 general election; announced candidacy on 11 April 2015 for the mayor as well as council seat for the Albany ward. Withdrew from mayoral race on 21 March 2016 and endorsed John Palino.
Cameron Brewer, Auckland councillor for the Ōrākei ward
Colin Craig, founder and former leader of the Conservative Party
Tex Edwards, co-founder of mobile telecommunications company 2degrees
Theresa Gattung, former CEO of Telecom New Zealand
Paul Henry, broadcaster
Penny Hulse, incumbent deputy mayor of Auckland
Maurice Williamson, National MP for Pakuranga

Debates
A debate held on 15 February was attended by Goff, Crone, Bright, Thomas, Berry and Hay. Goff promoted the public-private partnership construction of a light rail network in Auckland, while Berry described the idea as fiscally irresponsible and out of date. Maria Slade of Stuff.co.nz opined the debate outcome as a victory for Goff.

Goff, Crone and Thomas participated in a 17 June debate, in which traffic congestion was discussed, and Goff lamented the late commitment to the City Rail Link as an example of poor investment in public infrastructure. A debate was scheduled for 8 September at the University of Auckland's School of Architecture and Planning, to be chaired by journalist Rod Oram.

Opinion polling

Results

By local board

Source:

See also
 2016 Mount Roskill by-election

Notes

References

Mayoral elections in Auckland
Auckland Council
2016 elections in New Zealand
2010s in Auckland
October 2016 events in New Zealand